Grabit or GrabIt may refer to:

 Grabit (cookware)
 GrabIt, a news reader program for Windows